Daniel Surian Tan  (born July 29, 1959), simply known as Danny Tan, is a Filipino musician known for his songwriting and musical directing for the Philippine movie, television, theatre, and recording industries.  He is associated with Ryan Cayabyab, Raul Mitra, and Regine Velasquez. He was a student of National Artist Lucio San Pedro at the University of the Philippines College of Music. He was among those Filipino artists commissioned for the 2019 Southeast Asian Games opening performance, under the direction of Floy Quintos.

Career
In 1989, Tan did the musical arrangements for Regine Velasquez at the 2nd Asia Pacific Song Festival held in Hong Kong where Velasquez emerged as champion. In 1991, Tan arranged the Jose Javier Reyes-composed song "Hindi Sapat ang Lahat" for the movie The Real Life of Pacita M starring Nora Aunor. The musical score won him a 1991 Metro Manila Film Festival award and a 1992 Star Award.

For the Philippine millennium celebration covered by BBC in 2000, Tan composed the song "Written in the Sand" which was sung by Regine Velasquez at the fountain area The Peninsula Manila Hotel, along with 2,000 children. The event was televised in 67 broadcast networks globally, and was aired live through GMA Network in the Philippines.

In 2007, GMA Network produced a singing competition for the younger age bracket Popstar Kids, hosted by Kyla, and aired it on QTV 11 (now GMA News TV). Tan was its musical director and consequently become manager of the music group SugarPop. The group was consisted of the top 5 finalists of the reality singing contest: Rita Iringan, Julie Anne San Jose, Vanessa Rangadhol, Pocholo Bismonte, and Renzo Almario.

In 2008, GMA Network produced the second incarnation of the Idol franchise in the Philippines with Pinoy Idol, where Tan served as musical director.

In 2009, Tan served as one of the judges of GMA 7's reality singing competition Are You The Next Big Star? along with Pops Fernandez, Randy Santiago, Mon Faustino, and Annie Faustino. The show was hosted by Regine Velasquez.

He was nominated with Sherwin Castillo for Asintado in the category Best Musical Score at the 2015 FAMAS Awards

He is a pet industry entrepreneur in the Philippines, starting in 2000.

Awards

References

External links 
 

1959 births
Filipino songwriters
Filipino musicians
People from Sulu
Living people